The 1997 Badminton World Cup was the nineteenth edition of an international tournament Badminton World Cup. The event was held in Yogyakarta, Indonesia from 20 to 24 August 1997. The tournament draw was released on 14 August 1997. Some new rules for intervals between the games were also introduced. China won 3 titles, while Indonesia finished with the titles in 2 disciplines.

Medalists

Men's singles

Finals

Women's singles

Finals

Men's doubles

Finals

Women's doubles

Finals

Mixed doubles

Finals

References 

Badminton World Cup
1997 in badminton
Sports competitions in Yogyakarta
1997 in Indonesian sport
International sports competitions hosted by Indonesia